Dany is a 2001 Malayalam language Indian  political comedy drama film written, directed and produced by T.V. Chandran with Mammootty in the title role. Also starring in the film are noted danseuse Mallika Sarabhai, Vani Viswanath, Siddique, Vijayaraghavan, Ratheesh, popular television actress Maya Moushmi , Raji menon and Narendra Prasad. It released coinciding with the festival of Christmas in December 2001. The film met with critical acclaim with most of the critics hailing the performance of Mammootty. It won numerous awards including a National Film Award and three Kerala State Film Awards.

Plot
The film is about Daniel Thompson, a saxophone player who is a mute witness to many of the historical happenings taking place around in the world. The film traces the life of this character up to his seventy third year and comments upon many things that may have social and political relevance.  Dany as he is known, was born on the day of the Dandi Salt March (12 March 1930). His mother died on the day Guruvayur Satyagraha was conducted (21 September 1932). His father died on the day of the first widow remarriage in Namboothiri caste (15 September 1935). His wife leaves him on the day the first Communist Government of Kerala loses power (31 July 1959). Dany's love, disappointments, triumphs everything coincides with historical events. Dany dons many roles in life. He sings in the church. Then he becomes a saxophone player. He marry Margaret, daughter of a rich man named Chavero when the old man ask him to save the honor of their family. Margaret is pregnant and her lover has died. But with the passage of time, Dany is abandoned by all and he finds himself destined to lead a desolate existence. He ends up in a hospital. And it is here that he meets Bhargavi Amma, a retired professor, who is also desolate after the death of her daughter and after being totally isolated in life. Dany and Bhargavi Amma develop an intimacy and they travel back together from the hospital. But Dany passes away on the way. Anyhow Bhargavi Amma decides to perform the funeral rites in the Christian manner in the compound of her house, a house of orthodox Hindus. This creates certain problems, but Bhargavi Amma decides to dare all such problems.

Cast
 Mammootty as Daniel Thompson aka Dany
 Mallika Sarabhai as Bhargavi Amma
 Vani Viswanath as Margarette, Dany's wife
 Siddique as Freddy
 Vijayaraghavan as Robert, Dany's son.
 Maya Moushmi as Louisiana, Daughter of Dany and Clara
 Ratheesh as Dr. Renji Thomas
 Narendra Prasad as Fr. Simon
 N. F. Varghese as Prof. Padmanabha Menon
 Poornima Mohan as Madhavi
 Urmila Unni as Jayalakshmi
 Devadevan Vijayaraghavan as younger Robert and Albert, Robert's son
 Aliyar as Narayanan Nair
 Irshad as Murukan
 Sona Nair as Anna
 Reena
 Sivaji as Ramabhadran
 P. Sreekumar as Chavaro
 Raji Menon as Clara, as dany's first wife

Awards
 National Film Awards
 Best Feature Film in Malayalam - T. V. Chandran
 Kerala State Film Awards
 Best Director - T. V. Chandran
 Best Photography - K. G. Jayan
 Best Processing Lab - Chitranjali
 Other awards
 John Abraham Award for Best Malayalam Film - T. V. Chandran

References

External links
 
 Dany at the Malayalam Movie Database
 Unni R. Nair. (7 June 2001). "Dani— Travelling with history". Screen India
 "മമ്മൂട്ടി:ഭാഷയും ദേശവും- 6". Mathrubhumi.

2000s Malayalam-language films
Films scored by Johnson
2001 comedy-drama films
2001 films
Films directed by T. V. Chandran
Best Malayalam Feature Film National Film Award winners
2001 comedy films
2001 drama films
Indian comedy-drama films